One male athlete from Indonesia competed at the 1996 Summer Paralympics in Atlanta, United States.

See also
Indonesia at the Paralympics
Indonesia at the 1996 Summer Olympics

References 

Nations at the 1996 Summer Paralympics
1996
Summer Paralympics